A wound-rotor motor, also known as slip ring-rotor motor, is a type of induction motor where the rotor windings are connected through slip rings to external resistance. Adjusting the resistance allows control of the speed/torque characteristic of the motor. Wound-rotor motors can be started with low inrush current, by inserting high resistance into the rotor circuit; as the motor accelerates, the resistance can be decreased.

Compared to a squirrel-cage rotor, the rotor of the slip ring motor has more winding turns; the induced voltage is then higher, and the current lower, than for a squirrel-cage rotor.  During the start-up a typical rotor has 3 poles connected to the slip ring. Each pole is wired in series with a variable power resistor. When the motor reaches full speed the rotor poles are switched to short circuit.  During start-up the resistors reduce the field strength at the stator. As a result, the inrush current is reduced. Another important advantage over squirrel-cage motors is higher starting torque.

The speed and torque characteristics of a wound-rotor motor can be adjusted by changing the external resistance, unlike a squirrel cage motor which has a fixed characteristic. This is useful for speed control of the motor.

A wound-rotor motor can be used in several forms of adjustable-speed drive. Common applications include hoists and conveyor systems. Certain types of variable-speed drives recover slip-frequency power from the rotor circuit and feed it back to the supply, allowing wide speed range with high energy efficiency. Doubly-fed electric machines use the slip rings to supply external power to the rotor circuit, allowing wide-range speed control. Today speed control by use of slip ring motor is mostly superseded by induction motors with variable-frequency drives.

References

Induction motors